Approximations for the mathematical constant pi in the history of mathematics reached an accuracy within 0.04% of the true value before the beginning of the Common Era. In Chinese mathematics, this was improved to approximations correct to what corresponds to about seven decimal digits by the 5th century.

Further progress was not made until the 15th century (through the efforts of Jamshīd al-Kāshī). Early modern mathematicians reached an accuracy of 35 digits by the beginning of the 17th century (Ludolph van Ceulen), and 126 digits by the 19th century (Jurij Vega), surpassing the accuracy required for any conceivable application outside of pure mathematics.

Since the middle of the 20th century, the approximation of  has been the task of electronic digital computers (for a comprehensive account, see Chronology of computation of ). On June 8, 2022, the current record was established by Emma Haruka Iwao with Alexander Yee's y-cruncher with 100 trillion digits.

Early history
The best known approximations to  dating to before the Common Era were accurate to two decimal places; this was improved upon in Chinese mathematics in particular by the mid-first millennium, to an accuracy of seven decimal places. After this, no further progress was made until the late medieval period.

Some Egyptologists
This claim has been met with skepticism.

Babylonian mathematics usually approximated  to 3, sufficient for the architectural projects of the time (notably also reflected in the description of Solomon's Temple in the Hebrew Bible).

The Mahabharata (500 BCE - 300 CE) offers an approximation of 3, in the ratios offered in Bhishma Parva verses: 6.12.40-45.

In the 3rd century BCE, Archimedes proved the sharp inequalities  <  < , by means of regular 96-gons (accuracies of 2·10−4 and 4·10−4, respectively).

In the 2nd century CE, Ptolemy used the value , the first known approximation accurate to three decimal places (accuracy 2·10−5).

He also suggested that 3.14 was a good enough approximation for practical purposes. He has also frequently been credited with a later and more accurate result, π ≈  = 3.1416 (accuracy 2·10−6), although some scholars instead believe that this is due to the later (5th-century) Chinese mathematician Zu Chongzhi.
Zu Chongzhi is known to have computed  to be between 3.1415926 and 3.1415927, which was correct to seven decimal places. He also gave two other approximations of : π ≈  and π ≈ , which are not as accurate as his decimal result. The latter fraction is the best possible rational approximation of  using fewer than five decimal digits in the numerator and denominator. Zu Chongzhi's results surpass the accuracy reached in Hellenistic mathematics, and would remain without improvement for close to a millennium.

In Gupta-era India (6th century), mathematician Aryabhata, in his astronomical treatise Āryabhaṭīya stated:

Approximating  to four decimal places: π ≈  = 3.1416, Aryabhata stated that his result "approximately" ( "approaching") gave the circumference of a circle. His 15th-century commentator Nilakantha Somayaji (Kerala school of astronomy and mathematics) has argued that the word means not only that this is an approximation, but that the value is incommensurable (irrational).

Middle Ages
One of them is now known as the Madhava–Leibniz series, based on 

The other was based on 

 

He also improved the formula based on arctan(1) by including a correction:

It is not known how he came up with this correction.

Jamshīd al-Kāshī (Kāshānī), a Persian astronomer and mathematician, correctly computed the fractional part of 2 to 9 sexagesimal digits in 1424, and translated this into 16 decimal digits after the decimal point:

which gives 16 correct digits for π after the decimal point:

 

He achieved this level of accuracy by calculating the perimeter of a regular polygon with 3 × 228 sides.

16th to 19th centuries
In the second half of the 16th century, the French mathematician François Viète discovered an infinite product that converged on  known as Viète's formula.

He was so proud of this accomplishment that he had them inscribed on his tombstone.

In Cyclometricus (1621), Willebrord Snellius demonstrated that the perimeter of the inscribed polygon converges on the circumference twice as fast as does the perimeter of the corresponding circumscribed polygon. This was proved by Christiaan Huygens in 1654.

In 1719,  Thomas de Lagny used a similar identity to calculate 127 digits (of which 112 were correct). In 1789, the Slovene mathematician Jurij Vega improved John Machin's formula to calculate the first 140 digits, of which the first 126 were correct. In 1841, William Rutherford calculated 208 digits, of which the first 152 were correct.

The English amateur mathematician William Shanks, a man of independent means, calculated  to 530 decimal places in January 1853, of which the first 527 were correct (the last few likely being incorrect due to round-off errors). He subsequently expanded his calculation to 607 decimal places in April 1853, but an error introduced right at the 530th decimal place rendered the rest of his calculation erroneous; due to the nature of Machin's formula, the error propagated back to the 528th decimal place, leaving only the first 527 digits correct once again. Twenty years later, Shanks expanded his calculation to 707 decimal places in April 1873. Due to this being an expansion of his previous calculation, all of the new digits were incorrect as well. Shanks was said to have calculated new digits all morning and would then spend all afternoon checking his morning's work. This was the longest expansion of  until the advent of the electronic digital computer three-quarters of a century later.

20th and 21st centuries

His series are now the basis for the fastest algorithms currently used to calculate . Even using just the first term gives

See Ramanujan–Sato series.

From the mid-20th century onwards, all calculations of  have been done with the help of calculators or computers.

In 1944, D. F. Ferguson, with the aid of a mechanical desk calculator, found that William Shanks had made a mistake in the 528th decimal place, and that all succeeding digits were incorrect.

For one, it was known that any error would produce a value slightly high, and for the other, it was known that any error would produce a value slightly low. And hence, as long as the two series produced the same digits, there was a very high confidence that they were correct. The authors outlined what would be needed to calculate  to 1 million decimal places and concluded that the task was beyond that day's technology, but would be possible in five to seven years.

In 1989, the Chudnovsky brothers computed  to over 1 billion decimal places on the supercomputer IBM 3090 using the following variation of Ramanujan's infinite series of :

Records since then have all been accomplished using the Chudnovsky algorithm.
In November 2002, Yasumasa Kanada and a team of 9 others used the Hitachi SR8000, a 64-node supercomputer with 1 terabyte of main memory, to calculate  to roughly 1.24 trillion digits in around 600 hours (25days).

Recent Records 

 In August 2009, a Japanese supercomputer called the T2K Open Supercomputer more than doubled the previous record by calculating  to roughly 2.6 trillion digits in approximately 73 hours and 36 minutes.
Calculations were performed in base 2 (binary), then the result was converted to base 10 (decimal). The calculation, conversion, and verification steps took a total of 131 days.
This was the world record for any type of calculation, but significantly it was performed on a home computer built by Kondo. The calculation was done between 4 May and 3 August, with the primary and secondary verifications taking 64 and 66 hours respectively.
 In October 2011, Shigeru Kondo broke his own record by computing ten trillion (1013) and fifty digits using the same method but with better hardware.
The computation took (with three interruptions) 105 days to complete, the limitation of further expansion being primarily storage space.
   In March 2019, Emma Haruka Iwao, an employee at Google, computed 31.4 (approximately ) trillion digits of pi using y-cruncher and Google Cloud machines. This took 121 days to complete.
 In January 2020, Timothy Mullican announced the computation of 50 trillion digits over 303 days.

Practical approximations
Depending on the purpose of a calculation,  can be approximated by using fractions for ease of calculation.

Non-mathematical "definitions" of  
Of some notability are legal or historical texts purportedly "defining " to have some rational value, such as the "Indiana Pi Bill" of 1897, which stated "the ratio of the diameter and circumference is as five-fourths to four" (which would imply "") and a passage in the Hebrew Bible that implies that .

Indiana bill

The so-called "Indiana Pi Bill" from 1897 has often been characterized as an attempt to "legislate the value of Pi". Rather, the bill dealt with a purported solution to the problem of geometrically "squaring the circle".

A mathematics professor who happened to be present the day the bill was brought up for consideration in the Senate, after it had passed in the House, helped to stop the passage of the bill on its second reading, after which the assembly thoroughly ridiculed it before postponing it indefinitely.

Imputed biblical value

The issue is discussed in the Talmud and in Rabbinic literature. Among the many explanations and comments are these:
Rabbi Nehemiah explained this in his Mishnat ha-Middot (the earliest known Hebrew text on geometry, ca. 150 CE) by saying that the diameter was measured from the outside rim while the circumference was measured along the inner rim. This interpretation implies a brim about 0.225 cubit (or, assuming an 18-inch "cubit", some 4 inches), or one and a third "handbreadths," thick (cf.  and ).
 Maimonides states (ca. 1168 CE) that  can only be known approximately, so the value 3 was given as accurate enough for religious purposes. This is taken by some as the earliest assertion that  is irrational.

There is still some debate on this passage in biblical scholarship. Many reconstructions of the basin show a wider brim (or flared lip) extending outward from the bowl itself by several inches to match the description given in  In the succeeding verses, the rim is described as "a handbreadth thick; and the brim thereof was wrought like the brim of a cup, like the flower of a lily: it received and held three thousand baths" , which suggests a shape that can be encompassed with a string shorter than the total length of the brim, e.g., a Lilium flower or a Teacup.

Development of efficient formulae

Polygon approximation to a circle
Archimedes, in his Measurement of a Circle, created the first algorithm for the calculation of  based on the idea that the perimeter of any (convex) polygon inscribed in a circle is less than the circumference of the circle, which, in turn, is less than the perimeter of any circumscribed polygon. He started with inscribed and circumscribed regular hexagons, whose perimeters are readily determined. He then shows how to calculate the perimeters of regular polygons of twice as many sides that are inscribed and circumscribed about the same circle. This is a recursive procedure which would be described today as follows: Let  and  denote the perimeters of regular polygons of  sides that are inscribed and circumscribed about the same circle, respectively. Then,

Using these last values he obtains

It is not known why Archimedes stopped at a 96-sided polygon; it only takes patience to extend the computations. Heron reports in his Metrica (about 60 CE) that Archimedes continued the computation in a now lost book, but then attributes an incorrect value to him.

Archimedes uses no trigonometry in this computation and the difficulty in applying the method lies in obtaining good approximations for the square roots that are involved. Trigonometry, in the form of a table of chord lengths in a circle, was probably used by Claudius Ptolemy of Alexandria to obtain the value of  given in the Almagest (circa 150 CE).

A trigonometric improvement by Willebrord Snell (1621) obtains better bounds from a pair of bounds obtained from the polygon method. Thus, more accurate results were obtained from polygons with fewer sides. Viète's formula, published by François Viète in 1593, was derived by Viète using a closely related polygonal method, but with areas rather than perimeters of polygons whose numbers of sides are powers of two.

The last major attempt to compute  by this method was carried out by Grienberger in 1630 who calculated 39 decimal places of  using Snell's refinement.

Machin-like formula

For fast calculations, one may use formulae such as Machin's:
 
together with the Taylor series expansion of the function arctan(x). This formula is most easily verified using polar coordinates of complex numbers, producing:

({,} = {239, 132} is a solution to the Pell equation 2−22 = −1.)

Formulae of this kind are known as Machin-like formulae.

For instance, Shanks and his team used the following Machin-like formula in 1961 to compute the first 100,000 digits of :

and they used another Machin-like formula,

as a check.

The record as of December 2002 by Yasumasa Kanada of Tokyo University stood at 1,241,100,000,000 digits. The following Machin-like formulae were used for this:
 
K. Takano (1982).
 
F. C. M. Størmer (1896).

Other classical formulae
Other formulae that have been used to compute estimates of  include:

Liu Hui (see also Viète's formula):
 

Madhava:

Newton / Euler Convergence Transformation:

Euler:

(Evaluated using the preceding series for )

Ramanujan:

David Chudnovsky and Gregory Chudnovsky:

Ramanujan's work is the basis for the Chudnovsky algorithm, the fastest algorithms used, as of the turn of the millennium, to calculate .

Modern algorithms
The latter, found in 1985 by Jonathan and Peter Borwein, converges extremely quickly:

For  and

The Gauss–Legendre algorithm (with time complexity , using Harvey–Hoeven multiplication algorithm) is asymptotically faster than the Chudnovsky algorithm (with time complexity ) – but which of these algorithms is faster in practice for "small enough"  depends on technological factors such as memory sizes and access times. For breaking world records, the iterative algorithms are used less commonly than the Chudnovsky algorithm since they are memory-intensive.

A former calculation record (December 2002) by Yasumasa Kanada of Tokyo University stood at 1.24 trillion digits, which were computed in September 2002 on a 64-node Hitachi supercomputer with 1 terabyte of main memory, which carries out 2 trillion operations per second, nearly twice as many as the computer used for the previous record (206 billion digits). The following Machin-like formulae were used for this:

    (Kikuo Takano (1982))

     (F. C. M. Størmer (1896)).

These approximations have so many digits that they are no longer of any practical use, except for testing new supercomputers. Properties like the potential normality of  will always depend on the infinite string of digits on the end, not on any finite computation.

Miscellaneous approximations
Historically, base 60 was used for calculations. In this base,  can be approximated to eight (decimal) significant figures with the number 3;8,29,44, which is

(The next sexagesimal digit is 0, causing truncation here to yield a relatively good approximation.)

In addition, the following expressions can be used to estimate :
 accurate to three digits:

 accurate to three digits:
 
 Karl Popper conjectured that Plato knew this expression, that he believed it to be exactly , and that this is responsible for some of Plato's confidence in the omnicompetence of mathematical geometry—and Plato's repeated discussion of special right triangles that are either isosceles or halves of equilateral triangles.
 
 accurate to four digits:

 accurate to four digits (or five significant figures):

 an approximation by Ramanujan, accurate to 4 digits (or five significant figures):

 accurate to five digits:

 
 accurate to six digits:
 

 accurate to seven digits:

 - inverse of first term of Ramanujan series.
 accurate to eight digits:

accurate to nine digits:
 
 accurate to ten digits:

 accurate to ten digits:

 accurate to ten digits (or eleven significant figures):

This curious approximation follows the observation that the 193rd power of 1/ yields the sequence 1122211125...
 accurate to eleven digits:

 accurate to twelve digits:

 accurate to 16 digits:
 - inverse of sum of first two terms of Ramanujan series.

 accurate to 18 digits:

This is based on the fundamental discriminant  = 3(89) = 267 which has class number (-) = 2 explaining the algebraic numbers of degree 2. The core radical  is 53 more than the fundamental unit  which gives the smallest solution { , } = {500, 53} to the Pell equation 2 − 892 = −1.
 accurate to 24 digits:
 - inverse of sum of first three terms of Ramanujan series.
 accurate to 30 decimal places:

 Derived from the closeness of Ramanujan constant to the integer 6403203+744. This does not admit obvious generalizations in the integers, because there are only finitely many Heegner numbers and negative discriminants d with class number h(−d) = 1, and d = 163 is the largest one in absolute value.
 accurate to 52 decimal places:

Like the one above, a consequence of the j-invariant. Among negative discriminants with class number 2, this d the largest in absolute value.
 accurate to 161 decimal places:

where u is a product of four simple quartic units,

and,
 
Based on one found by Daniel Shanks. Similar to the previous two, but this time is a quotient of a modular form, namely the Dedekind eta function, and where the argument involves . The discriminant d = 3502 has h(−d) = 16.
 The continued fraction representation of  can be used to generate successive best rational approximations. These approximations are the best possible rational approximations of  relative to the size of their denominators. Here is a list of the first thirteen of these:
 
The accuracy can be improved by using other fractions with larger numerators and denominators, but, for most such fractions, more digits are required in the approximation than correct significant figures achieved in the result.

Summing a circle's area

Pi can be obtained from a circle if its radius and area are known using the relationship:

If a circle with radius  is drawn with its center at the point (0, 0), any point whose distance from the origin is less than  will fall inside the circle. The Pythagorean theorem gives the distance from any point ( ) to the center:

Squares whose center resides inside or exactly on the border of the circle can then be counted by testing whether, for each cell ( ),

Mathematically, this formula can be written:

For example, if  is 5, then the cells considered are:
{| style="font-size:75%;text-align:center;color:blue;height:1em" cellspacing="15"
|- style="color:black"
| (−5,5) || (−4,5) || (−3,5) || (−2,5) || (−1,5) || style="color:#bc1e47" | (0,5) || (1,5) || (2,5) || (3,5) || (4,5) || (5,5)
|-
| style="color:black" | (−5,4) || style="color:black" | (−4,4) || style="color:#bc1e47" | (−3,4) || (−2,4) || (−1,4) || (0,4) || (1,4) || (2,4) || style="color:#bc1e47" | (3,4) || style="color:black" | (4,4) || style="color:black" | (5,4)
|-
| style="color:black" | (−5,3) || style="color:#bc1e47" | (−4,3) || (−3,3) || (−2,3) || (−1,3) || (0,3) || (1,3) || (2,3) || (3,3) || style="color:#bc1e47" | (4,3) || style="color:black" | (5,3)
|-
| style="color:black" | (−5,2) || (−4,2) || (−3,2) || (−2,2) || (−1,2) || (0,2) || (1,2) || (2,2) || (3,2) || (4,2) || style="color:black" | (5,2)
|-
| style="color:black" | (−5,1) || (−4,1) || (−3,1) || (−2,1) || (−1,1) || (0,1) || (1,1) || (2,1) || (3,1) || (4,1) || style="color:black" | (5,1)
|-
| style="color:#bc1e47" | (−5,0) || (−4,0) || (−3,0) || (−2,0) || (−1,0) || (0,0) || (1,0) || (2,0) || (3,0) || (4,0) || style="color:#bc1e47" | (5,0)
|-
| style="color:black" | (−5,−1) || (−4,−1) || (−3,−1) || (−2,−1) || (−1,−1) || (0,−1) || (1,−1) || (2,−1) || (3,−1) || (4,−1) || style="color:black" | (5,−1)
|-
| style="color:black" | (−5,−2) || (−4,−2) || (−3,−2) || (−2,−2) || (−1,−2) || (0,−2) || (1,−2) || (2,−2) || (3,−2) || (4,−2) || style="color:black" | (5,−2)
|-
| style="color:black" | (−5,−3) || style="color:#bc1e47" | (−4,−3) || (−3,−3) || (−2,−3) || (−1,−3) || (0,−3) || (1,−3) || (2,−3) || (3,−3) || style="color:#bc1e47" | (4,−3) || style="color:black" | (5,−3)
|-
| style="color:black" | (−5,−4) || style="color:black" | (−4,−4) || style="color:#bc1e47" | (−3,−4) || (−2,−4) || (−1,−4) || (0,−4) || (1,−4) || (2,−4) || style="color:#bc1e47" | (3,−4) || style="color:black" | (4,−4) || style="color:black" | (5,−4)
|- style="color:black"
| (−5,−5) || (−4,−5) || (−3,−5) || (−2,−5) || (−1,−5) || style="color:#bc1e47" | (0,−5) || (1,−5) || (2,−5) || (3,−5) || (4,−5) || (5,−5)
|}

For related results see The circle problem: number of points (x,y) in square lattice with x^2 + y^2 <= n.

Similarly, the more complex approximations of  given below involve repeated calculations of some sort, yielding closer and closer approximations with increasing numbers of calculations.

Continued fractions
Besides its simple continued fraction representation [3; 7, 15, 1, 292, 1, 1,...], which displays no discernible pattern,  has many generalized continued fraction representations generated by a simple rule, including these two.

(Other representations are available at The Wolfram Functions Site.)

Trigonometry

Gregory–Leibniz series
The Gregory–Leibniz series
 
is the power series for arctan(x) specialized to  = 1. It converges too slowly to be of practical interest.

Arctangent

Knowing that 4 arctan 1 = , the formula can be simplified to get:
 

with a convergence such that each additional 10 terms yields at least three more digits.

Another formula for  involving arctangent function is given by

where  such that . Approximations can be made by using, for example, the rapidly convergent Euler formula

Alternatively, the following simple expansion series of the arctangent function can be used

where

to approximate  with even more rapid convergence. Convergence in this arctangent formula for  improves as integer  increases.

The constant  can also be expressed by infinite sum of arctangent functions as

and

where  is the n-th Fibonacci number.

Arcsine
Observing an equilateral triangle and noting that
 
yields
 
with a convergence such that each additional five terms yields at least three more digits.

Digit extraction methods
The Bailey–Borwein–Plouffe formula (BBP) for calculating  was discovered in 1995 by Simon Plouffe. Using  math, the formula can compute any particular digit of —returning the hexadecimal value of the digit—without having to compute the intervening digits (digit extraction).
 
The algorithm requires virtually no memory for the storage of an array or matrix so the one-millionth digit of  can be computed using a pocket calculator. However, it would be quite tedious and impractical to do so.
 

Efficient methods
He worked with mathematician Godfrey Harold Hardy in England for a number of years.

 

Bailey's website contains the derivation as well as implementations in various programming languages.

Fabrice Bellard further improved on BBP with his formula:

Other formulae that have been used to compute estimates of  include:

Newton.

Srinivasa Ramanujan.
This converges extraordinarily rapidly. Ramanujan's work is the basis for the fastest algorithms used, as of the turn of the millennium, to calculate .

In 1988, David Chudnovsky and Gregory Chudnovsky found an even faster-converging series (the Chudnovsky algorithm): 
.

The speed of various algorithms for computing pi to n correct digits is shown below in descending order of asymptotic complexity. M(n) is the complexity of the multiplication algorithm employed.

Projects

Pi Hex
Pi Hex was a project to compute three specific binary digits of  using a distributed network of several hundred computers. In 2000, after two years, the project finished computing the five trillionth (5*1012), the forty trillionth, and the quadrillionth (1015) bits. All three of them turned out to be 0.

Software for calculating 
Over the years, several programs have been written for calculating  to many digits on personal computers.

General purpose
Most computer algebra systems can calculate  and other common mathematical constants to any desired precision.

Functions for calculating  are also included in many general libraries for arbitrary-precision arithmetic, for instance Class Library for Numbers, MPFR and SymPy.

Special purpose
Programs designed for calculating  may have better performance than general-purpose mathematical software. They typically implement checkpointing and efficient disk swapping to facilitate extremely long-running and memory-expensive computations.
 TachusPi by Fabrice Bellard is the program used by himself to compute world record number of digits of pi in 2009.
 -cruncher by Alexander Yee is the program which every world record holder since Shigeru Kondo in 2010 has used to compute world record numbers of digits. -cruncher can also be used to calculate other constants and holds world records for several of them.
 PiFast by Xavier Gourdon was the fastest program for Microsoft Windows in 2003. According to its author, it can compute one million digits in 3.5 seconds on a 2.4 GHz Pentium 4. It can also work at lesser efficiency with very little memory (down to a few tens of megabytes to compute well over a billion (109) digits). This tool is a popular benchmark in the overclocking community. PiFast 4.4 is available from Stu's Pi page. PiFast 4.3 is available from Gourdon's page.
 QuickPi by Steve Pagliarulo for Windows is faster than PiFast for runs of under 400 million digits. Version 4.5 is available on Stu's Pi Page below. The software may be obtained from the Pi-Hacks Yahoo! forum, or from Stu's Pi page.
 Super PI by Kanada Laboratory in the University of Tokyo is the program for Microsoft Windows for runs from 16,000 to 33,550,000 digits. It can compute one million digits in 40 minutes, two million digits in 90 minutes and four million digits in 220 minutes on a Pentium 90 MHz. Super PI version 1.9 is available from Super PI 1.9 page.

See also
 Milü
 Madhava's correction term

Notes

References
 
 
 
 
  
 

Approximations
History of mathematics
Pi
Pi algorithms
Real transcendental numbers